Paul Yingling is a retired United States Army Colonel. In 2007 Yingling published an article in the Armed Forces Journal criticizing senior leadership for perceived failures in the conduct of the post-invasion Iraq War occupation.  Yingling served three tours in the Iraq War, first as executive officer of 2nd Battalion, 18th Field Artillery in OIF I, as the effects coordinator for the 3rd ACR from March 2005 to March 2006 during OIF III, and finally as J5 for Task Force 134 (Detainee Operations) from April 2008 to July 2009. He retired from the Army in 2012 to teach high school social studies.

Career
Yingling graduated from Duquesne University in 1989 with a degree in international relations, and was commissioned as a 2nd Lieutenant in Field Artillery through Army ROTC. His first tour was with the 1st Infantry Division, where he served as a fire direction officer during the Gulf War. He attended FA Advanced Course and was assigned to the 41st Field Artillery Brigade in Germany, where he commanded a target acquisition battery. In December 1995, he deployed to Bosnia as part of the NATO IFOR.

He subsequently earned a master's degree in international relations from the University of Chicago, and taught at West Point. He is also a graduate of the School of Advanced Military Studies at the Command and General Staff College in Fort Leavenworth, Kansas.

Yingling was a division planner with 2nd Infantry Division prior to his deployment to OIF I as a battalion executive officer. In OIF I, his unit was tasked with collecting enemy ammunition and training the Iraqi Civil Defense Corps. On his second deployment to Iraq, as the effects coordinator, he was responsible for information operations, public affairs, psychological operations, civil affairs, and Iraqi Security Forces development. On his third deployment to Iraq, as J5 [Plans] for Task Force 134, he planned the transition from security detention under the UN mandate to criminal detention procedures under Iraqi domestic law. Yingling was reportedly selected for promotion to Colonel, but his current biography shows that he retired at the rank of Lieutenant Colonel.

Yingling retired from the US Army in late 2011 to teach high school social studies.  As he left, Yingling published an opinion piece in the Washington Post where he expressed frustration with senior leadership in trying to reform an entrenched bureaucracy.

Criticism of the United States Department of Defense 
Yingling wrote an article called "A Failure in Generalship" that appeared on April 27, 2007, in the Armed Forces Journal. The Washington Post described it as "a blistering attack on U.S. generals" and a signal of the "public emergence of a split inside the military between younger, mid-career officers and the top brass". He argues that the U.S. general corps needs to be overhauled because it failed to anticipate the post-invasion insurgency in Iraq, and because of its reluctance to admit the onset of such an insurgency in 2004. He likened Iraq to the Vietnam War, stating, "for the second time in a generation, the United States faces the prospect of defeat at the hands of an insurgency". Because the Vietnam and Iraq wars were commanded by different generals, he concludes that the U.S. generalship as an institution, not individual generals, has failed. He proposes that the U.S. Congress take more interest in military affairs, especially when confirming generals. Generals, in his opinion, need to be aware that future U.S. wars will not involve one large enemy army but rather smaller, difficult-to-target groups of insurgents. He states that the United States needs generals to be more creative, as well as have a better understanding of military history, international relations, and foreign cultures.

Even before he published the influential Armed Forces Journal article, Yingling had made his dissatisfactions known in interviews conducted for the Army's oral history archives. He said that although "building host-nation institutions" was the crux of counterinsurgency strategy, "all our organizations are designed around the least important line of operations: combat operations".

See also
 Lt. Col. John Nagl – co-author with Yingling in Field Artillery and Armed Forces Journal
 General David Petraeus – co-authored Counterinsurgency Field Manual with John Nagl
 Counterinsurgency operations in Tal Afar, under pioneering Colonel H.R. McMaster when commanding the 3rd Armoured Cavalry Regiment
 Colonel Gian Gentile – critic of counterinsurgency advocates

References

External links
The FA in the Long War: A New Mission in COIN. co-authored with Lt. Col. John Nagl
New Rules for New Enemies  co-authored with Lt. Col. John Nagl
"Interview with Combat Studies Institute" (2006); CSI is a think tank of the U.S. Army Combined Arms Center at Fort Leavenworth, Kansas

Living people
United States Army officers
United States Army personnel of the Iraq War
University of Chicago alumni
Duquesne University alumni
Year of birth missing (living people)